The 1987 Atlantic hurricane season was an event in the annual Atlantic hurricane season in the north Atlantic Ocean. It was a below-average season, having fewer named storms than in a normal year, that resulted in little impact throughout the Atlantic basin; the United States recorded no hurricane-related fatalities, making the 1987 season the fourth to do so since 1976. The season officially began on June 1, 1987 and ended November 30, 1987. These dates, adopted by convention, historically describe the period in each year when most systems form. Even so, a pre-season storm, Tropical Depression One, led to the season's starting on May 25. Storm activity ended several weeks early; the final storm of the season, Tropical Depression Fourteen, dissipated on November 4.

The season had fourteen tropical depressions, of which seven intensified into tropical storms—an average season has ten tropical storms—three became hurricanes and one, Emily, became a major hurricane. The inactivity throughout the basin was linked to persistent, strong vertical wind shear; most of the season's storms were unable to intensify due to the shear, resulting in a low number of named storms and hurricanes. The two most notable storms of the season were Hurricanes Arlene and Emily. Hurricane Arlene spent roughly 14.5 days as a tropical storm before intensifying into a hurricane, the longest span between these intensities on record. Hurricane Emily was the only major hurricane of the season; its wind speeds peaked at  before impacting the Dominican Republic. Three fatalities occurred in the Dominican Republic because of the storm and damages were estimated up to $80.3 million (1987 USD).

This timeline documents tropical cyclone formations, strengthening, weakening, landfalls, extratropical transitions, and dissipations during the season. It includes information that was not released throughout the season, meaning that data from post-storm reviews by the National Hurricane Center, such as a storm that was not initially warned upon, has been included.

By convention, meteorologists one time zone when issuing forecasts and making observations: Coordinated Universal Time (UTC), and also use the 24-hour clock (where 00:00 = midnight UTC). In this time line, all information is listed by UTC first with the respective local time included in parentheses.

Timeline

May

May 24
8:00 am EDT (1200 UTC) – Tropical Depression One forms 170 miles (275 kilometers) east-southeast of Cockburn Town, Turks and Caicos Islands.

May 30

May 31
8:00 pm EDT (0000 UTC June 1) – Tropical Depression One dissipates in the Florida Strait.

June
June 1
The Atlantic hurricane season officially begins.

July
 There was no tropical cyclone activity in the Atlantic basin during July 1987.

August
August 9

1:00 pm CDT (1800 UTC) – Tropical Depression Two intensifies into a Tropical Storm but is not assigned a name.

August 10
1:00 am CDT (0600 UTC) – Tropical Storm Two weakens into a tropical depression.
2:00 pm EDT (1800 UTC) – Tropical Depression Three forms over Andros Island in The Bahamas.
Exact time unknown – Tropical Depression Three makes landfall near Freeport on Grand Bahama Island.

August 11

August 13
8:00 pm AST (0000 UTC August 14) – Tropical Depression Four forms about 840 mi (1,350 km) east-southeast of Barbados.

August 14
8:00 pm EDT (0000 UTC August 15) – Tropical Depression Two re-emerges into the Gulf of Mexico.

August 15

August 17
2:00 am EDT (0600 UTC) – Tropical Depression Two dissipates over southeastern Georgia.

August 18

August 20
2:00 am AST (0600 UTC) – Tropical Storm Bret reaches its peak intensity with winds of  while located about 710 mi (1,145 km) west-northwest of Brava, Cape Verde.

August 22
2:00 am AST (0600 UTC) – Tropical Storm Arlene intensifies into a Category 1 hurricane on the Saffir–Simpson hurricane scale while located about 815 mi (1,310 km) southwest of the Azores Islands.
2:00 am AST (0600 UTC) – Tropical Storm Bret weakens into a tropical depression while located about 825 mi (1,330 km) northeast of Barbados.

August 23
8:00 pm AST (0000 UTC) – The National Hurricane Center (NHC) issues their final advisory on Hurricane Arlene as it transitions into an extratropical cyclone.

August 24
8:00 am AST (1200 UTC) – Tropical Depression Bret degenerates into a tropical wave over the central Atlantic Ocean.

August 30

September
September 2
2:00 pm AST (1800 UTC) – Tropical Depression Six dissipates about 895 mi (1,440 km) west of Antigua and Barbuda.

September 5

September 6

September 7
8:00 am AST (1200 UTC) – Tropical Depression Seven strengthens into Tropical Storm Cindy about 1,050 mi (1,690 km) northwest of the Cape Verde Islands.
2:00 pm AST (1800 UTC) – Tropical Depression Eight makes landfall with winds of  near Puerto Cabezas, Nicaragua shortly before dissipating.

September 8
2:00 am EDT (0600 UTC) – Tropical Depression Nine dissipates over North Carolina.

September 10
2:00 pm AST (1800 UTC) – The last advisory on Tropical Storm Cindy is released as it becomes extratropical over the northern Atlantic.

September 13

September 17

September 18
2:00 pm AST (1800 UTC) – Tropical Storm Dennis weakens into a tropical depression while located around 660 mi (1,060 km) northeast of Barbados.

September 19

September 20

2:00 pm AST (1800 UTC) – Tropical Depression Dennis transitions into an extratropical cyclone over the central Atlantic.

September 21

September 22
2:00 am AST (0600 UTC) – Tropical Storm Emily intensifies into a Category 1 hurricane.
8:00 am AST (1200 UTC) – Hurricane Emily intensifies into a Category 2 hurricane.

September 23
2:00 am AST (0600 UTC) – Hurricane Emily weakens into a Category 1 hurricane.
8:00 am AST (1200 UTC) – Hurricane Emily weakens into a tropical storm.

September 25

September 26
2:00 pm AST (1800 UTC) – Hurricane Emily transitions into an extratropical cyclone over the northeastern Atlantic.

October
October 9

October 10
October 11
8:00 pm EDT (0000 UTC October 12) – Tropical Storm Floyd makes landfall in western Cuba near Guane.

October 12
8:00 pm EDT (0000 UTC) – Hurricane Floyd weakens into a tropical storm.

October 13
2:00 pm EDT (1800 UTC) –Tropical Storm Floyd transitions into an extratropical cyclone to the northeast of the Bahamas.

October 31

November

November 2

November 4
8:00 am EDT (1200 UTC) – Tropical Depression Fourteen makes landfall near Tampa, Florida.
2:00 pm EDT (1800 UTC) – Tropical Depression Fourteen dissipates over Florida.

November 30
The Atlantic hurricane season officially ends.

See also

Lists of Atlantic hurricanes

Notes

References

External links
 nhc.noaa.gov, National Hurricane Center homepage

1987 Atlantic hurricane season
1987 meteorology
1987 Atlantic hurricane season
Articles which contain graphical timelines
1987 ATL T